Graham Smith (born November 25, 1995) is an American professional soccer player who plays as a defender for Memphis 901 in the USL Championship.

College and youth
Smith grew up in Colorado where he played soccer while attending Mountain Vista High School. He played two years of college soccer at Oregon State University between 2014 and 2015, before transferring to the University of Denver in 2016.

Smith appeared for Premier Development League side Colorado Rapids U-23 in 2017.

Career
On January 19, 2018, Smith was drafted in the first-round (18th overall) during the 2018 MLS SuperDraft by Sporting Kansas City. Smith signed with Sporting KC on February 15, 2018.

Smith made his professional debut with Kansas City's United Soccer League affiliate Swope Park Rangers, on March 17, 2018, where Swope Park Rangers finished 4–3 winners against Reno 1868.

Smith made his Major League Soccer debut with Sporting Kansas City on June 23, 2018, where he started in a 3–2 victory over Houston Dynamo. Smith made two appearances in his first season with SKC, before seeing an expanded role in 2019. Smith logged his first MLS goal on August 17, 2019, in a 2–1 victory at home against San Jose Earthquakes. He would also log his first MLS assist on the lone goal in a 1–0 victory over Houston Dynamo on August 31, 2019. He finished the season with ten starts in eleven total appearances, including a pair of clean sheets. 

Following the 2021 season, Smith's contract with Kansas City expired.

On February 18, 2022, Smith signed with USL Championship side Memphis 901 ahead of their upcoming 2022 season.

Honours
Individual
USL Championship All League Second Team: 2022

References

External links 
 
 

1995 births
Living people
American soccer players
Association football defenders
Colorado Rapids U-23 players
Denver Pioneers men's soccer players
Major League Soccer players
Memphis 901 FC players
Oregon State Beavers men's soccer players
People from Highlands Ranch, Colorado
Soccer players from Colorado
Sporting Kansas City draft picks
Sporting Kansas City players
Sportspeople from the Denver metropolitan area
Sporting Kansas City II players
USL Championship players
USL League Two players